Reidar Eide (6 November 1940 – February 1999) was a Norwegian motorcycle speedway rider who was champion of Norway on five occasions.

Biography
Born in Høyland, Eide took up speedway in 1957. He rode for Stavanger in 1960 and made his British League debut in 1966 for Edinburgh Monarchs, and during his career also rode in several other countries including Poland, Czechoslovakia, East Germany, West Germany, Sweden, Denmark, and Finland. In 1967 he averaged 8.99 points per match, scoring seven full maximum scores and averaged just over 9 in 1968. In 1969, for Coatbridge Monarchs, he averaged over 10. Gaining a reputation for being difficult to deal with, over the next three seasons he moved on to Wembley Lions, Poole Pirates, and Sheffield Tigers, before signing for Newport Wasps in 1973. He maintained his high scoring for Newport, averaging over 9 in the 1973, 74 and 75 league seasons. In 1976 he moved on to Leicester Lions, averaging over 7.5 before a broken leg ended his season. The following season, lacking fitness, his level of performance had dropped, taking seven rides to score his first point, and only averaging just over 3 points from six matches. In 1978 he moved on to Exeter Falcons, where he once again showed his true form, before moving on to Reading Racers the following year. In 1980, his last year in British speedway, he rode for Reading, Wolverhampton Wolves, Swindon Robins, and one match for Eastbourne Eagles.

Eide won the Norwegian Championship for five successive years between 1967 and 1971, and won the Nordic Championship in 1972. He finished in thirteenth place in the 1968 World Championship Final, and finished fifth (with Dag Lövaas) in the 1973 World Pairs final. He represented Norway and a combined Norway/Denmark team in international matches between 1969 and 1973.

Eide also skied competitively, representing Sandnes IL.

After speedway, Eide became a pig farmer. He died in February 1999 from brucellosis.

World final appearances

Individual World Championship
 1968 -  Göteborg, Ullevi - 13th - 3pts

World Pairs Championship
 1973 -  Borås  (with Dag Lövaas) - 5th - 17pts (9)

References

1940 births
1999 deaths
Norwegian speedway riders
Edinburgh Monarchs riders
Wembley Lions riders
Poole Pirates riders
Sheffield Tigers riders
Newport Wasps riders
Leicester Lions riders
Exeter Falcons riders
Reading Racers riders
Wolverhampton Wolves riders
Swindon Robins riders
Eastbourne Eagles riders